Fusibacter tunisiensis is a bacterium from the family Peptostreptococcaceae. It was isolated from an anaerobic reactor used to treat olive-mill wastewater.

References

Bacteria described in 2012
Peptostreptococcaceae